Jack Martin is an Australian actor. He is best known for his role as Ben Hall in the feature film The Legend of Ben Hall.

Career 
Martin first appeared in Channel 7's Home & Away, followed by several short film roles. His most notable performance as the 19th-century bushranger Ben Hall came in the biographical feature film The Legend of Ben Hall. He will also be reprising this role in two further companion films, forming a trilogy, based on two of Hall's contemporaries - Frank Gardiner and John Vane.

Filmography

References

External links 
 
 
 Jack Martin at StarNow

Australian male actors
Living people
Year of birth missing (living people)